Steven Heller (composer-producer) is a producer-composer, based in Asheville, North Carolina, who has won two Grammy Awards, as well as a number of national awards for his music and recordings. He was production music supervisor for the 1995 Miramax film, "The Journey of August King. He wrote and produced the theme music for "Conversations" and "Evening Rounds," listener call-in programs on the public radio station WCQS, in Asheville, North Carolina.  Steven Heller is the father of guitarist Drew Heller of the band Toubab Krewe.

Grammy awards
 1996 - 39th Annual Grammy Awards (February 26, 1997) - Best Spoken Word Album for Children: David Holt, narrator; David Holt, Steven Heller & Virginia Callaway, producers; for Stellaluna
 2002 - 45th Annual Grammy Awards (February 23, 2003) - Best Traditional Folk Album:  David Holt & Doc Watson, artists; Steven Heller, engineer/mixer; Steven Heller, producer; for Legacy

References

External links
 Legacy website (Doc Watson and David Holt)
 Bob Moog Foundation Board of Directors
 Grammy Awards Official Website
  Grammy Awards winners at Grammy.com (searchable database)

Grammy Award winners
Living people
Musicians from Asheville, North Carolina
Place of birth missing (living people)
Year of birth missing (living people)